The Šumera is a river in the Kėdainiai district municipality, Kaunas County, central Lithuania. The river flows into the Obelis (from the right side), a tributary of the Nevėžis, which is in turn a tributary of the Neman.

The Šumera starts nearby former Dargužiai village and flows mostly southwards through agriculture lands and the Lančiūnava-Šventybrastis Forest. It meets the Obelis in Pašumerys village.

The name Šumera (or Šiumera) is of obscure origin, maybe derived from Lithuanian Germanism šiumas ('foam, decoction').

References

Rivers of Lithuania
Kėdainiai District Municipality